John Eplee (born March 24, 1953) is an American politician. He has served as a Republican member for the 63rd district in the Kansas House of Representatives since 2017.

References

1953 births
Living people
Republican Party members of the Kansas House of Representatives
21st-century American politicians